Lluqu Lluqu (Aymara for heart, also spelled Llokho Llokho) is a mountain in the Andes of Bolivia which reaches a height of approximately . It is located in the Oruro Department, San Pedro de Totora Province. Lluqu Lluqu lies northeast of Japu Willk'i.

References 

Mountains of Oruro Department